Internacia Televido was an internet-based Esperanto-language television station, launched on 5 November 2005 by the Ĝangalo news site from São Paulo, Brazil.  A 24-hour streaming service funded primarily by viewer donations, the station ceased operation in August 2006.

Esperanto-language mass media